Bölk is a surname. Notable people with the surname include:

 Andrea Bölk (born 1968), German handball player
 Emily Bölk (born 1998), German handball player

See also
 Bolk (Louis Bolk; 1866–1930), Dutch anatomist